5F-EDMB-PINACA is a designer drug and synthetic cannabinoid.  In 2018, it was the fourth-most common synthetic cannabinoid identified in drugs seized by the Drug Enforcement Administration.

In the United States, 5F-EDMB-PINACA was temporarily emergency scheduled by the DEA in 2019. and made a permanent Schedule I Controlled Substance on April 7, 2022.

References

Indazolecarboxamides
Cannabinoids